Phyllonorycter persimilis is a moth of the family Gracillariidae. It is known from the islands of Honshū and Hokkaidō in Japan.

The larvae feed on Quercus dentata. They mine the leaves of their host plant.

References

persimilis
Moths of Japan
Moths described in 2001